Parliamentary elections were held in South Vietnam on 22 October 1967. Only a few candidates were affiliated with political parties. Voter turnout was reported to be 72.9%, with 4,270,794 of the 5,853,251 registered voters voting.

References

South Vietnam
Elections in South Vietnam
Parliamentary election
Election and referendum articles with incomplete results